"Somewhere", sometimes referred to as "Somewhere (There's a Place for Us)" or simply "There's a Place for Us", is a song from the 1957 Broadway musical West Side Story that was made into films in 1961 and 2021. The music is composed by Leonard Bernstein with lyrics by Stephen Sondheim.

In West Side Story

Stage musical 
In the stage musical, the song appears in the second act of the show during the Somewhere Ballet. It is performed by an off-stage soprano singer and is later reprised by the entire company. In the original Broadway production, "Somewhere" was sung by Reri Grist who played the role of Consuelo.

At the end of the show, when Tony is shot, Maria sings the first few lines of the song as he dies in her arms.

In late 1957, this recording was released on the album West Side Story (Original Broadway Cast).

1961 film 
In the 1961 film, the song occurs at a pivotal point, after the rumble in which Tony (Richard Beymer) has stabbed Maria's brother, Bernardo (George Chakiris). Having nowhere else to go, Tony runs to Maria (Natalie Wood), who has just been told of her brother's death and who killed him. When Tony comes to her room through the balcony window, Maria, in shock, pounds against his chest.

Realizing in spite of her anger that she still loves Tony, Maria begs him to hold her. After Maria cries out, "It's not us...it's everything around us." Tony replies, "Then I'll take you away, where nothing can get to us." He then begins singing "Somewhere" to her. His comforting voice draws her in and it becomes a duet of hope that their love will survive "somehow, someday, somewhere."

As in the stage show, Maria sings the first few lines of the song as Tony dies in her arms. In 2004, this version finished at #20 on AFI's 100 Years...100 Songs survey of top tunes in American cinema.

"Somewhere" is the only track that is out of sequence on the original soundtrack album as it is the last track on Side 2. This is rectified on the CD as "Somewhere" is correctly placed in sequence to the film between "The Rumble" and "Cool."

2021 film 
In the 2021 film, the song takes place after "I Feel Pretty," like in the stage show, except now it is sung by Valentina (Rita Moreno), a reworked version of the character Doc. The ballet is again omitted, like in the 1961 film. This version was also used to underscore the film's teaser trailer, which premiered during the 93rd Academy Awards telecast on April 25, 2021.

P. J. Proby version
In 1964, P. J. Proby released his version of "Somewhere", which reached numbers six on the British and eight on the Australian singles charts. The song also charted well in various European countries.

The Supremes' version
In 1965, the Supremes recorded the song for their album, There's a Place for Us, though it went unreleased until 2004. They also used it for their debut appearance at the Copacabana nightclub in New York City and it eventually became a fixture of their nightclub acts. They also sang the song on The Ed Sullivan Show and The Hollywood Palace. In contrast to the original melody, a special dramatic monologue was incorporated, which was frequently changed in conjunction with changes in the group as well as the country's turmoil in the late 1960s.

In the aftermath of the shooting of Martin Luther King Jr., the monologue was changed to reflect King's famous "I Have a Dream" speech. When the Supremes appeared on The Tonight Show Starring Johnny Carson the day after King had been murdered, lead singer Diana Ross was so overcome with emotion that she practically stumbled through the speech, but got an extraordinary ovation from the studio audience. It would once again be nationally televised several months later that year when the group paired up with the Temptations for an NBC television special, TCB. The monologue for that special went as follows:

Barbra Streisand version

In 1985, American singer, songwriter, actress and director Barbra Streisand released a version of "Somewhere" as a single from the Grammy Award-winning The Broadway Album. In the United States, it narrowly missed the top 40 on the Billboard Hot 100, peaking at number 43, but fared better on the Adult Contemporary chart, peaking at number five. It also peaked at number 88 on the UK Singles Chart. The song itself won the Grammy Award for Best Instrumental Arrangement Accompanying Vocal(s). In 2011, a duet was produced using scenes from Streisand's version while Jackie Evancho performed live with David Foster at the Ringling Museum of Art. On her 2014 Partners album, she released a new recording of the song, this time as a duet with Josh Groban.

Charts

Phil Collins version
British musician Phil Collins recorded the song in 1996 for the album The Songs of West Side Story.

Critical reception
Steve Baltin from Cash Box wrote, "Taken from the tribute album The Songs Of West Side Story, this classic takes on a whole new connotation than previously heard in Tom Waits and Barbara Streisand’s brilliant versions. Collins’ lush arrangement milks the song for all the sap it has to offer, bilking the schmaltz factor to create a song reminiscent of his more recent ballads. Look for strong support from Adult Contemporary for the track."

Charts

Pet Shop Boys version

"Somewhere" was released as a single by English synth-pop duo Pet Shop Boys on June 23, 1997, to promote their "Somewhere" residency at the Savoy Theatre in London, which was named after the song, and to promote a repackage of Bilingual.

The single was another top-10 entry for the group, peaking at number 9 on the UK Singles Chart. The single also peaked at number 25 on the Billboards Bubbling Under Hot 100 Singles chart. It also peaked at number 19 on the US Hot Dance Club Play chart. In the United States, the song was released as a double A-side with "A Red Letter Day".

The Pet Shop Boys' version also uses elements of another West Side Story song, "I Feel Pretty", and the album version uses elements of "One Hand, One Heart" spoken by Chris Lowe.

Critical reception
Barry Walters for The Advocate said Pet Shop Boys "do for this West Side Story standard what k.d. lang did for “Secret Love” in The Celluloid Closet — put a showbiz classic in the queer context it always deserved." Larry Flick from Billboard wrote, "In a perfect world, this wistful disco cover of the classic song (...) would meet with open arms at pop radio. But, alas, narrow programming minds and even tighter playlist space will probably limit this single to the clubs—which is not necessarily a sad fate. Partners Neil Tennant and Chris Lowe dress the song in vibrant trance/NRG keyboards and plucky beats." He added, "Also quite nice is a stately orchestral version that allows Tennant to be at his melodramatic best." 

British magazine Music Week rated the song three out of five, noting Tennant's "emotionally controlled vocals and a thumping techno pop beat". They also concluded, "But despite its high drama, this is too overblown, even by PSB standards." Editor Alan Jones felt that the duo "turns it from an emotional tour-de-force into a camp disco celebration, where its subleties are completely lost. Working with such a melodic and powerful song they can't help but succeed, however." David Sinclair from The Times viewed it as a "questionable disco version" of the West Side Story standard.

Track listings
 UK CD single 1 Parlophone CDRS 6470
"Somewhere"
"The View from Your Balcony"
"To Step Aside" (Ralphi's Old School Dub)
"Somewhere" (Forthright Vocal Mix)

 UK CD single 2 Parlophone CDR 6470
"Somewhere" (Orchestral version)
"Disco Potential"
"Somewhere" (Trouser Enthusiasts Mix)
"Somewhere" (Forthright Dub)

 UK cassette single TCR 6470
"Somewhere"
"Somewhere" (Orchestral version)
"The View from Your Balcony"

Charts

Other renditions
 Len Barry recorded "Somewhere", which was released as a single in 1966 that peaked at number 26 on the Billboard Hot 100.
 Since 1966, The Dartmouth Aires have performed "Somewhere," which quickly became the group's traditional alumni song. In addition to its appearance on several Aires albums, they performed a truncated version as a swan song after their runner-up placement on NBC's The Sing-Off in 2011.
 Tom Waits recorded the song on his 1978 album "Blue Valentine".
 Tina May, the British jazz singer, performed the song on her 1993 album Fun.
 Renato Russo, a Brazilian singer and composer, recorded the song on his 1994 debut solo album "The Stonewall Celebration Concert".
 Ben Platt performed this song at the 60th Annual Grammy Awards as a tribute to Leonard Bernstein.
 Rick Astley recorded the song for his 6th studio album Portrait in 2005.
Dave Koz recorded a jazz version featuring Anita Baker which is on his 2007 album At the Movies.  It was released as a single in 2006.
 Angeline Quinto recorded the song for the soundtrack of the period telenovela Ikaw Lamang, aired by Philippine television network ABS-CBN in 2014.
 Bobby Sanabria and his Multiverse Big Band performed the song with a Latin jazz arrangement using the Venezuelan joropo rhythm, recorded live in 2017, and released the following year on the Grammy-nominated  album West Side Story Reimagined, which won the Jazz Journalists Award for best album of 2018.
 Cynthia Erivo, Ben Platt, Leslie Odom Jr., and Rachel Zegler (the latter of whom played Maria in the 2021 film) performed this song at the 64th Annual Grammy Awards as a tribute to Stephen Sondheim during the In Memoriam segment.

References

External links 
 Leonard Bernstein & Stephen Sondheim's Somewhere Explored

1956 songs
1964 singles
1985 singles
1996 singles
1997 singles
Andy Williams songs
Aretha Franklin songs
Barbra Streisand songs
Ben Platt songs
Bobby Darin songs
Celtic Woman songs
Crazy Elephant songs
Devo songs
Glen Campbell songs
Grammy Award for Best Instrumental Arrangement Accompanying Vocalist(s)
Johnny Mathis songs
Marianne Faithfull songs
Pet Shop Boys songs
Phil Collins songs
Rick Astley songs
Sissel Kyrkjebø songs
Songs from West Side Story
Songs with music by Leonard Bernstein
The Supremes songs
We Five songs
Songs written by Stephen Sondheim
Columbia Records singles
Parlophone singles